The ninth season of the One Piece anime series was directed by Kōnosuke Uda and produced by Toei Animation. Like the rest of the series, it follows the adventures of Monkey D. Luffy and his Straw Hat Pirates from Eiichirō Oda's One Piece manga series. The majority of the season covers the  story arc, which adapts Oda's manga from the end of the 39th through the 45th volumes. "Ice Hunter" deals with the Straw Hats taking on the Atchino Family to retrieve their flag. The final episode is stand-alone storyline featuring Chopperman.

Afterwards, they avoid annihilation by the dreaded military operation . Lastly, they encounter a group of bounty hunters, called the Atchino Family.

Each episode of "Straw Hat Theatre & Straw Pirate Tales" features a 21-minute recap of the Straw Hats' backstories and 3-minute omake adaptation of a short comic by Oda which was originally published in the One Piece Log fan magazine. The "Historical Drama Boss Luffy" episodes are sequels to the fourth One Piece television special which take place in Grand Jipang.

The season initially ran from May 21, 2006, through December 23, 2007 on Fuji Television. Since then, nineteen DVD compilations, each containing three episodes of the "Enies Lobby" arc, were released by Avex Mode between January 9, 2008 and July 1, 2009. A 20th DVD, containing two episodes, was released on August 5, 2009. A 21st DVD, containing four episodes, was released on September 2, 2009. The special arc was released on a single DVD on May 23, 2008. In July 2012, Funimation announced they had acquired this season as part of their own US "Season Five".

The season uses six pieces of theme music: four opening themes and two ending themes. The two ending themes are "Adventure World" by Delicatessen, used in the first 15 episodes of the "Enies Lobby" arc, and "Family", also sung by the Straw Hats' voice actors, which was used to end the episodes of the special arc. All episodes of the second part of the "Enies Lobby" arc and after have since aired without an ending theme.

Episode list

Home releases

Japanese

English 
In North America, this season was recategorized as "Season Five" for its DVD release by Funimation Entertainment. The Australian Season Five sets were renamed Collection 22 through 27.

Notes

References 

2006 Japanese television seasons
2007 Japanese television seasons
One Piece seasons
One Piece episodes